Intimate Relations is a 1953 British drama film directed by Charles Frank and based upon the play Les Parents terribles by Jean Cocteau. The film was known in the U.S. as Disobedient. It was entered into the 1953 Cannes Film Festival.

Plot
Crisis in a middle-class family when the son falls in love with his father's mistress. Family ties are stretched to breaking point, and the mother fears she'll lose her son as well as her husband.

Cast
 Harold Warrender as George
 Marian Spencer as Yvonne
 Ruth Dunning as Leonie
 William Russell as Michael (as Enoch Russell)
 Elsie Albiin as Madeline (as Elsy Albin)

Critical reception
The New York Times'''s review concluded "the film's highlight, one superbly conceived and well-performed scene with the father and girl at loggerheads over the boy. As we contend, the author does know better. He has perceptively hammerlocked youth and age, and until the half-way mark, the above-mentioned encounter, the quandary is genuinely intriguing. But M. Cocteau's triumphant rattling of the Oedipus legend tilts the apple cart, and some of his own dialogue provides the best summary. "What a nightmare!" moans Miss Spencer at one point. Mr. Warrender: "You're telling me" ; and TV Guide'' wrote "the film is too talky and constricted by stage motifs. Enoch and Albiin, the mistress, do have a nice chemistry, though."

References

External links

1953 films
1953 drama films
British drama films
Films based on works by Jean Cocteau
British black-and-white films
1950s English-language films
1950s British films